Talawang  is a village development committee in Rolpa District in the Rapti Zone of mid-western development region of north-eastern Nepal. At the time of the 2011 Nepal census it had a population of 5180  people living in 1048 individual households.

References

Populated places in Rolpa District